Aja Aja Tayo! is a Philippine television reality variety show broadcast on TV5 on July 21, 2018. The first season ended on October 27, 2018. The show's second season aired on February 10, 2019 and ended on June 2, 2019.

Cast

Season 1
 Namki Hong
 Alwyn Uytingco
 Jean Kim
 Jojo Alejar
 Steena Koo
 Wilma Doesnt
 Jeffrey Espiritu

Season 2
 Namki Hong
 Alwyn Uytingco
 Jean Kim
 Fabio Ide
 Julian Trono
 Donnalyn Bartolome

Aja! Aja! Tayo sa Jeju

Aja! Aja! Tayo sa Jeju is a 2021 Philippine television variety show broadcast by Kapamilya Channel and A2Z. The show was shot in late 2019 in Jeju Island, South Korea. It premiered on March 20, 2021 to June 12, 2021 on the Saturday line-up replacing Pinoy Big Brother: Connect and was replaced by Bawal Lumabas: The Series.

Cast 
 Robi Domingo
 Kristel Fulgar
 Shine Kuk
 Donny Pangilinan

References

External links
 
 

TV5 (Philippine TV network) original programming
2018 Philippine television series debuts
Philippine variety television shows
Filipino-language television shows